Safari Motel was a 1956 motel formerly located on East Fremont Street in Las Vegas, Nevada. The establishment closed down in 2017 after years of criminal activity such as violent crime, drug use and health violations and was converted to homeless housing at a cost of $40,000.

References

1956 establishments in Nevada
Motels in the United States
Defunct hotels in the Las Vegas Valley